Cornelius O'Sullivan (born 1937) was an Irish Gaelic footballer who played for Cork Championship club Urhan. He was a member of the Cork senior football team for 12 years, during which time he lined out in a variety of positions but mostly at full-forward.

Honours

Urhan
Cork Intermediate Football Championship (1): 1967
Cork Junior Football Championship (1): 1960
Beara Junior Football Championship (5): 1955, 1956, 1957, 1958, 1959

Beara
Munster Senior Club Football Championship (1): 1967
Cork Senior Football Championship (1): 1967

Cork
Munster Senior Football Championship (2): 1966, 1967
Munster Junior Football Championship (1): 1957

References

1937 births
Living people
Urhan Gaelic footballers
Beara Gaelic footballers
Cork inter-county Gaelic footballers
Munster inter-provincial Gaelic footballers